Rupert II of Lüben (1396/1402 – 24 August 1431) was a Duke of Lubin (Lüben) and Chojnów (Haynau) since 1419/20 until his death.

He was the eldest son of Henry IX, Duke of Lubin, by his wife Anna, daughter of Przemyslaus I Noszak, Duke of Cieszyn.

Life
After the death of his father between 1419 and 1420 (the exact date was still debatable), Rupert inherited the Duchies of Lubin and Chojnów. His younger brothers Wenceslaus III and Louis III inherited the Duchies of Oława (Ohlau) and Niemcza jointly as co-rulers.

In 1422 he was named Knight of the Order of Malta in Poland, Bohemia and Moravia.

After his death without issue, Rupert II's duchies were inherited by his younger surviving brother Louis III.

References

1396 births
1431 deaths
Dukes of Silesia
Piast dynasty